The Coastal Mountain Conference or CMC is an athletic conference for secondary schools in Mendocino, Lake, Napa and Sonoma Counties that competes in the North Coast Section of the California Interscholastic Federation. Member schools are currently organized into three leagues (North Central Leagues I, II, and III) based on school size and various other criteria found in the conference's bylaws. League assignments are automatically reevaluated in all even numbered years or at any other time by written request of a member school, provided no other members file an objection. Conference champions from all three leagues advance in each sport to post-season competition in the North Coast Section's Division V bracket, of which the winner gains admission to the Class A state championship tournament.

The CMC is a CIF Class A conference (CIF Class A guideline: mostly schools with average enrollment of 600 students or less), though several schools are classified by the CIF as Class B and elect to "play up" in the CMC due to lack of a sufficient number of other similar size schools against which to compete. Similarly Lower Lake High School holds a 2A classification from the CIF but was granted a standing exemption to compete in a Class A conference as to do otherwise would require an excessive amount of travel. Classifications range from 4A for the largest, most historically competitive schools to B for the smallest and least competitive schools.

Current alignment

North Central League I 
The North Central League I (NCL I) houses the largest schools in the conference, the largest of which being Lower Lake High School with a 2A classification.

North Central League II 
Comprising nine schools in the state's B classification, some field incomplete or non-competitive teams while other, former members have been consistent in winning and have succeeded in being promoted into the NCL I.

North Central League III 
Most schools within NCL III are small mountain towns located around the redwood forests near Mendocino County, some of which lack the student interest necessary to field a complete team each year for most sports. League schedules for each sport are usually available once the tryout period has closed and they have communicated to the Conference office the level of participation they can reasonably expect to provide.

Former members 
Santa Rosa Christian High School

Athletics 
The CMC offers an array of sports; Swimming, Football, Soccer, Basketball, Baseball, Softball, Wrestling, Volleyball, Tennis, Track and Field, Cross Country, and Golf.

Football 
Sending one team from each league, the CMC sent Middletown and St. Helena as its lone representatives to the Class A Playoffs in 2006 and sent Tomales, Calistoga and Mendocino for the Class B playoffs. While Middletown and St. Helena were eliminated in the first round, Tomales played Mendocino in the Class B final.

Volleyball 
In 2006, the CMC sent Clear Lake to the Division 4 Playoffs while sending St. Helena, Cloverdale, Anderson Valley, Rincon Valley Christian, Tomales and Mendocino to the Division 5 playoffs. RVC and Anderson Valley fared the best as the latter fell to eventual champions Crystal Springs Uplands in the semi finals while the former lost to Crystal Springs in the final.

Basketball 
In Boys' Basketball, the CMC sent Fort Bragg and Middletown as its two teams. Both fell in the first rounds. In Girls', Willits, Kelseyville and Lower Lake made their way to the playoffs but only to go the same fate as the boys.

In Division 5 action, Cloverdale, Calistoga, Rincon Valley Christian, Point Arena and Mendocino qualified for the Boys' Playoffs. Cloverdale went on to the semi finals where they lost to International. The girl's side sent Rincon Valley Christian, St. Vincent, Calistoga, and Laytonville. RVC made a spectacular run to the finals where they lost against a great Branson team.

References

External links 

CIF North Coast Section
Education in Lake County, California
Education in Mendocino County, California
Education in Napa County, California
Education in Sonoma County, California